The Waterloo Junction Railway (WJR) is a short line railway in the Region of Waterloo, Ontario, Canada. It runs northward from the former Grand Trunk Railway (GTR) North Main Line in downtown Kitchener, through Waterloo and St. Jacobs before terminating in Elmira. It is currently owned by the City of Waterloo and operated by CN as the Waterloo Spur. The Waterloo Central Railway runs tourist trains on the line, and the Ion rapid transit runs on the route for a short distance.

History

The line was chartered in 1889 and the first section from Kitchener (then known as Berlin) to Waterloo opened in 1890. The mainline to Elmira opened on 27 October 1891, and the Grand Trunk Railway (GTR) leased the line for 39 years. The original planned end point in Drayton and the planned branches to Elora or Listowel were never completed. As part of a general reorganization, on 1 April 1893 the line was merged into the GTR. In 1910, the original station in Waterloo was rebuilt in brick.

By 1916, the twilight years of the Grand Trunk, the line was listed in employee timetables as a part of the Berlin Subdivision along with the former Preston and Berlin Railway, which had originally been built by the Great Western Railway before being acquired by the Grand Trunk, and connected Berlin to Preston and Galt (now parts of Cambridge) via the mill towns of German Mills and Doon. The southern section, the former Preston and Berlin, was known as the "Galt Section" of the subdivision, while the northern section, the former Waterloo Junction Railway, was known as the "Elmira Section". The subdivision was soon renamed to the "Kitchener Subdivision" following  the Berlin to Kitchener name change.

The line became part of the Canadian National Railways (CNR, later simply CN) in 1923 when it took over the bankrupt Grand Trunk Railway, and eventually was known as the Waterloo Spur of the greater CN Guelph Subdivision. The section from Kitchener to Elmira was purchased by the Regional Municipality of Waterloo in 1995. CN continued freight operations on the line until 1998, when they leased the entire subdivision to the Goderich–Exeter Railway (GEXR). The GEXR's 20-year lease ran out and control of the Guelph Subdivision returned to CN on 16 November 2018.

In 1997, a group of locals formed the Waterloo–St. Jacobs Railway to run passenger trains on off-days, and especially on weekends to the St. Jacobs Farmers' Market. The company went out of business in 2000 after building a new station at Erb and Caroline Streets in Waterloo, and the operation was purchased by the City of Waterloo. In 2007, the Southern Ontario Locomotive Restoration Society relocated to the region and formed the Waterloo Central Railway running tourist trains on the line between the station and the Market, and later expanded to Elmira.

Since 2019, a central section of the line has been used for the Ion light rail service between Waterloo Public Square station and Northfield station. CN continues to run freight operations on the line, operating at night when the Ion service is closed.

Almost all of the original line remains active, except for a spur to Elias Weber Bingeman Snider's Pioneer flour mill in what is now Uptown Waterloo, as well as grain silos in downtown St. Jacobs. The former St. Jacobs passenger station is now used as the Waterloo Central Railway Museum.

Route
Unless otherwise noted, the following is taken from the Southern Ontario Railway Map

The line starts at a junction with the GTR mainline in Kitchener, about a block east of Kitchener station at Weber Street. The line initially runs west-northwest to cross Weber and then bending westward at Roger where a former spur serviced factories on Roger. It meanders northwestward as it crosses downtown Waterloo and the main station on Erb Street. At University Avenue it begins to turn northward, passing through the industrial areas on the north end of the city.

After crossing Benjamin Road on the northern limit of Waterloo it meets the St. Jacobs Market with a stop at the former Heidelberg station. The country opens up as the line runs north to the western side of St. Jacobs. A short spur serves the Home Hardware central warehouses on the western side of town, while another serves St. Jacob's station. The former downtown spur branched off just north of the station.

The line continues roughly northward to enter Elmira on the eastern side of town through an industrial area. The line ends just south of Church Street, where a number of spurs service the Lanxess chemical plant at the eastern end of Mill Street and Canada Colors and Chemicals on First Street.

Rail trails
Some parts of the Waterloo Spur are paralleled by multi-use walking and cycling trails, which were constructed in the railway line's right of way in the rail with trail style.

The innermost trail toward the junction in downtown Kitchener is the Spurline Trail, which covers the  distance between downtown Kitchener and uptown Waterloo along the line. The Spurline Trail runs mainly through urban areas and was formally established in 2016.

See also

 List of Ontario railways

References

External links
 History of Waterloo Central Railway

Rail transport in Waterloo, Ontario
Rail transport in Kitchener, Ontario
Rail transport in Woolwich, Ontario
Ontario railways
Canadian companies established in 1889
Grand Trunk Railway subsidiaries
Standard gauge railways in Canada